James Ash (born 1973) is a musician.

James Ash may also refer to:
James Ash (MP) (died 1400), English politician
Jim Ash, radio host on WLCN

See also
James Ashe (1674–1733), English politician